was a Japanese statesman, courtier, politician and editor during the Heian period.  He is credited as one of the collaborative compilers of the Nihon Kōki.

Career at court
He was a minister during the reigns of Emperor Saga, Emperor Junna and Emperor Ninmyō.

 788 (Enryaku 7, 2nd month): He received his first court rank.
 825 (Tenchō 2): From the rank of Dainagon, Otsugu was raised to the position of Udaijin (Minister of the Right).
 832 (Tenchō 9): Otsugu was named Sadaijin (Minister of the Left).
 837 (Jōwa 3): Otsugu asked to resign due to the poor state of the imperial treasury, which he blamed on an excess of officials and overly lavish dining, and an insufficient knowledge of Yin and yang.
 843 (Jōwa 10): Work was completed on the multi-volume Nihon Kōki; and Otsugu was a significant contributor.

Genealogy
Otsugu's father was Fujiwara no Momokawa.

Notes

References
 Nussbaum, Louis-Frédéric and Käthe Roth. (2005).  Japan encyclopedia. Cambridge: Harvard University Press. ;  OCLC 58053128
 Titsingh, Isaac. (1834).  Annales des empereurs du Japon (Nihon Odai Ichiran).  Paris: Royal Asiatic Society, Oriental Translation Fund of Great Britain and Ireland. OCLC 5850691 

773 births
843 deaths
Fujiwara clan
People of Heian-period Japan